The Han Yang Ling, or the Yang Mausoleum of Han, is the mausoleum of Emperor Jing, the sixth emperor of the Western Han Dynasty and his Empress Wang. The mausoleum complex is a part of the Western Han dynasty imperial tombs located in the Weicheng district of the City of Xianyang, Shaanxi Province, on the northern bank of the Wei River and about 20 km to the north of the city center of the provincial capital of Xi’an.

Description 

The Han Yang Ling is composed of two large burial mounds, 86 smaller burial pits and a criminals' graveyard. The site today also hosts a museum. The larger of the two mounds is the burial place of the Jing Emperor, it sits next to the slightly smaller mound of his Empress Wang. The mausoleum is surrounded by 86 outer burial pits, 21 of which are accessible to visitors. The pits display more than 50,000 miniature terracotta figures reflecting the daily life of the Han emperor's court, including eunuchs, servants, tools and domesticated animals. The human figurines are naked but were originally clothed with exquisite fabrics. The complex is one of the "Five Mausoleums" of the Western Han Dynasty.

In 2016, the discovery of the earliest tea traces known to date from the mausoleum of Emperor Jing  was announced, indicating that tea was drunk by Han Dynasty emperors as early as 2nd century BC.

See also 

 Terracotta Army
 Rule of Wen and Jing

Notes and references

Further reading 
 English language website of the museum.
 Online version updated in 2007.
 Li Liajun was affiliated with Art Museum of the Xi'an Jiaotong University.

Buildings and structures in Xi'an
Han dynasty architecture
Mausoleums in China
Pyramids in China
National archaeological parks of China
Major National Historical and Cultural Sites in Shaanxi
Tourist attractions in Xi'an
National first-grade museums of China